Referendums in Kenya are polls held in Kenya on particular issues.

List 
 2005
 2010
 2021

See also 
 Referendum

References 

Constitutional amendments
Referendums in Kenya